Ian González Nieto (born 11 February 1993), sometimes known simply as Ian, is a Spanish professional footballer who played as a striker for Liga MX club Toluca.

Club career
Born in Madrid, González graduated with Atlético Madrid's youth setup, making his debuts with the C-team in the 2011–12 campaign, in Tercera División. In the middle of 2013, he was promoted to the reserves in Segunda División B.

On 11 January 2014, after appearing rarely for the side, González was loaned to another reserve team, Getafe CF B until June. He returned to the Colchoneros in June, and suffered relegation with the B's at the end of the 2014–15 season.

In July 2015 González returned to Getafe B, being also called up to the pre-season with the first team. He made his professional – and La Liga – debut on 22 August, coming on as a second-half substitute for Pedro León in a 0–1 away loss against RCD Espanyol.

On 8 August 2016, González was presented at CE Sabadell FC. He subsequently represented Linares Deportivo and CD Móstoles URJC before moving abroad for the first time in his career on 29 May 2018, by joining Ascenso MX side Atlético San Luis.

On 9 June 2021, González joined Toluca.

References

External links

1993 births
Living people
Footballers from Madrid
Spanish footballers
Association football forwards
La Liga players
Segunda División B players
Tercera División players
Atlético Madrid C players
Atlético Madrid B players
Getafe CF B players
Getafe CF footballers
CE Sabadell FC footballers
CD Móstoles URJC players
Liga MX players
Ascenso MX players
Atlético San Luis footballers
Club Necaxa footballers
Spanish expatriate footballers
Spanish expatriate sportspeople in Mexico
Expatriate footballers in Mexico